The Skagerrak is a strait running between the Jutland peninsula of Denmark, the southeast coast of Norway and the west coast of Sweden, connecting the North Sea and the Kattegat sea area through the Danish Straits to the Baltic Sea.

The Skagerrak contains some of the busiest shipping routes in the world, with vessels from every corner of the globe. It also supports an intensive fishing industry. The ecosystem is strained and negatively affected by direct human activities. Oslo and Gothenburg are the only large cities in the Skagerrak region.

Name
The meaning of Skagerrak is most likely the Skagen Channel/Strait. Skagen is a town near the northern cape of Denmark (The Skaw). Rak means 'straight waterway' (compare the Damrak in Amsterdam); it is cognate with reach. The ultimate source of this syllable is the Proto-Indo-European root *reg-, 'straight'. Rak means 'straight' as in 'straight ahead' in modern Norwegian and Swedish. Råk in both modern Norwegian and Swedish refers to a channel or opening of water in an otherwise ice-covered body of water. There is no evidence to suggest a connection with the modern Danish word rak (meaning rabble or riff-raff). Another possibility is that the Skagerrak was named by Dutch seafarers, in the same way the adjacent Kattegat got its name. It was quite common for the Dutch to call similar stretches of waterways a rak, such as: Langerak, Damrak, Gouderak, and Tuikwerderrak. (See Kattegat for its etymology, in which gat means "gate" or "hole".)

Geography

It deepens toward the Norwegian coast, reaching over 700 m at the Norwegian Trench. Some ports along the Skagerrak are Oslo, Larvik and Kristiansand in Norway, Skagen, Hirtshals and Hanstholm in Denmark and Uddevalla, Lysekil and Strömstad in Sweden.

The Skagerrak has an average salinity of 80 practical salinity units, which is very low, close to that of brackish water, but comparable to most other coastal waters.

Extent
The International Hydrographic Organization defines the limits of the Skagerrak as follows:
On the West. A line joining Hanstholm and the Naze (Lindesnes).

On the Southeast. The Northern limit of the Kattegat [A line joining Skagen (The Skaw, North Point of Denmark) and Paternosterskären and thence Northeastward through the shoals to Tjörn Island].

History

Older names for the combined Skagerrak and Kattegat were the Norwegian Sea or Jutland Sea; the latter appears in the Knýtlinga saga.

Until the construction of the Eider Canal in 1784 (a predecessor to the Kiel Canal), Skagerrak was the only way in and out of the Baltic Sea. For this reason the strait has had a busy international traffic for centuries. After the Industrial Revolution, the traffic increased and today Skagerrak is among the busiest straits in the world. In 1862, a short cut, the Thyborøn Channel at the Limfjord was constructed in Denmark through Skagerrak from the North Sea by going directly to the Kattegat. The Limfjord supports only minor transports though.

In both world wars, the Skagerrak was strategically very important for Germany. The biggest sea battle of the First World War, the Battle of Jutland, also known as the Battle of the Skagerrak, took place here May 31 to June 1, 1916. In the Second World War, the importance of controlling this waterway, the only sea access to the Baltic, was the motive for the German invasions of Denmark, Norway and the construction of the northern parts of the Atlantic Wall. Both of these naval engagements have contributed to the large number of shipwrecks in the Skagerrak.

Traffic and industry 

Skagerrak is a heavily trafficated strait, with c. 7,500 individual vessels (excluding fishing vessels) from all over the world visiting in 2013 alone. Cargo ships are by far the most common vessel in Skagerrak at c. 4,000 individual ships in 2013, followed by tankers, which are nearly half as frequent. When viewed in combination with the Baltic Sea area, ships from 122 different nationalities visited in 2013, with most of these carrying cargo or passengers within Europe, regardless of their flag state.

Nearly all commercial vessels in Skagerrak are tracked by the Automatic Identification System (AIS).

Recreation 
Skagerrak is popular for recreational activities in all three countries. There are many summer house residences and several marinas along the coasts.

Biology
The Skagerrak is habitat for approximately 2,000 marine species, many of them adapted to its waters. For example, a variety of Atlantic cod called the Skagerrak cod spawns off the Norwegian coast. The eggs are buoyant and the hatchlings feed on zooplankton. Juveniles sink to the bottom where they have a shorter maturity cycle (2 years). They do not migrate but remain local to Norwegian fjords.

The variety of habitats and the large volume of plankton on the surface support prolific marine life. Energy moves from the top to the bottom according to Vinogradov's ladder of migrations; that is, some species are benthic and others pelagic, but there are graded marine layers within which species move vertically for short distances. In addition, some species are benthopelagic, moving between surface and bottom. The benthic species include Coryphaenoides rupestris, Argentina silus, Etmopterus spinax, Chimaera monstrosa and Glyptocephalus cynoglossus. On the top are Clupea harengus, Scomber scombrus, Sprattus sprattus. Some species that move between are Pandalus borealis, Sabinea sarsi, Etmopterus spinax.

Reefs 

Apart from sandy and stony reefs, extensive cold water coral reefs, mostly of Lophelia, are growing in Skagerrak. The Säcken Reef in the Swedish marine protection of Koster Fjord is an ancient cold water coral reef and the only known coral reef in the country. The Tisler Reef in the Norwegian marine protection of Ytre Hvaler National Park is the largest known coral reef in Europe. Lophelia reefs are also present in the Norwegian trench and they are known from the shallow waters of many Norwegian fjords.

Skagerrak also holds a number of rare bubble reefs; biological reefs formed around cold seeps of geological carbohydrate outgassings, usually methane. These rare habitats are mostly known from the Danish waters of Skagerrak west of Hirtshals, but more might be discovered in future surveys. Bubbly reefs are very rare in Europe and supports a very varied ecosystem.

With the centuries long heavy international seatraffic of Skagerrak, the seabed also holds an abundance of shipwrecks. Wrecks on shallow waters, provides a firm anchoring for several corals and polyps and explored wrecks have been revealed to support Dead Man's Fingers corals, Brittle stars and large wolffish. A 2020 seafloor mapping project around Jammerbugten in Skaggerak, ran by danish explorer Klaus Thymann, found evidence of much greater biodiversity in a range seafloor habitats previously thought to be sandy with a low density of wildlife. Dead Man’s Fingers corals were again among the species documented for the first time in these coastal habitats.

Environmental concerns 
Scientists and environmental institutions have expressed concern about the increasing pressure on the ecosystem in Skagerrak. The pressure has already had negative impacts and is caused by cumulative environmental effects, of which direct human activities are only one piece of the puzzle. Climate change and ocean acidification are expected to have increasing impacts on the Skagerrak ecosystem in the future.

Skagerrak and the North Sea receives considerable inputs of hazardous material and radioactive substances. Most is ascribed to long-range transport from other countries, but not all. Marine litter is also a growing problem. Until recently, waste water and sewage pouring into Skagerrak from settlements and industries was not treated at all. In combination with wash out of excessive nutrients from conventional farming, this has often led to large algae blooms.

Protections 

There are several marine protections in Skagerrak, including:

Norway
 Ytre Hvaler National Park,  established on 26 June 2009
 Raet National Park,  established on 16 December 2016

Sweden
 Kosterhavet National Park
 Bratten, a newly designated  Natura 2000 sea area beyond Kosterhavet.
 Gullmarsfjorden, Sweden's first marine conservation area from 1983.

Denmark
 Grenen and a  sea area immediately north.

See also
Danish Straits

References

External links

  The Baltic Sea, Kattegat and Skagerrak Swedish Meteorological and Hydrological Institute (SMHI).
 Skagerrak Deep-water Fish Assemblage
 Skagerrak Marine vessel Traffic

 
Denmark–Sweden border
International straits
Landforms of Västra Götaland County
Norway–Sweden border
Straits of Denmark
Straits of Norway
Straits of Sweden